Milltown Brothers are an English indie band from Colne, Lancashire, England.

Career
Their first release, in 1989, was the "Coming From The Mill" EP which became single of the week in the NME magazine, and featured the songs "Roses", "We've Got Time" and "Something On My Mind". The same publication tipped Milltown Brothers for stardom in the 1990s, along with The Hoovers, Carter the Unstoppable Sex Machine, The Charlatans, The Mock Turtles and New Fast Automatic Daffodils.

The band's second indie single was "Which Way Should I Jump", with "Silvertown" as the B-side. After the band signed to A&M Records worldwide in 1990, "Which Way Should I Jump?" was re-recorded and entered the UK Singles Chart at number 38, and reached number 10 in the U.S. Billboard Modern Rock chart.

An album, called Slinky, followed. It peaked at number 27 in the UK Albums Chart. Q Magazine described it as the "Byrds with hard-edged contemporary pop and upfront vocals". The next single released from the album was "Here I Stand", which was also used as the theme tune for the television programme, Preston Front. It peaked at number 41 in the UK Singles Chart.  They were supported on the tour to promote this album by Beware the Green Monkey, fronted by Bruce Thomas with Paul Chapman on bass. 

In 1993, the band released the album Valve. It was not as successful as Slinky and they left the A&M label. It took 10 years for the band to work together again, but in March 2004 they released their third studio album, Rubberband, which was released on their own label Rubber Band Records and made available at their website.

In the summer of 2015, Milltown Brothers released their new album Long Road, and again it was self-released.

Fraser has also played bass in Jay Diggins' band and is frontman of Greenheart, a band from Lancaster.

Line-up
 Matt Nelson - Vocals/Guitar
 Simon Nelson - Guitar
 James Fraser - Bass
 Barney Williams - Organ/piano 
 Nian Brindle - Drums

Discography

Albums
Slinky (1991) (No. 27 UK)
Valve (1993)
Rubberband (2004)
Long Road (2015)
Stockholm (2020)

Singles

References

External links
Official website
YouTube

English indie rock groups